In molecular biology 2-oxo-4-hydroxy-4-carboxy-5-ureidoimidazoline decarboxylase (OHCU decarboxylase)  is an enzyme involved in purine catabolism. It catalyses the decarboxylation of 2-oxo-4-hydroxy-4-carboxy-5-ureidoimidazoline (OHCU) into S(+)-allantoin. It is the third step of the conversion of uric acid (a purine derivative) to allantoin. Step one is catalysed by urate oxidase and step two is catalysed by hydroxyisourate hydrolase.

References

Protein domains